The Massachusetts Woman Suffrage Association (MWSA) was an American organization devoted to women's suffrage in Massachusetts. It was active from 1870 to 1919.

History
The MWSA was founded in 1870 by suffrage activists Julia Ward Howe, Lucy Stone, Henry Browne Blackwell, and others.  It was affiliated initially with the national American Woman Suffrage Association, which had been founded the previous year, and later became a chapter of the National American Woman Suffrage Association (NAWSA).  One of its own affiliates was the Cambridge Political Equality Association.

The MWSA lobbied for women to get the vote and the right to be officials of civic organizations such as school boards, educated people about women's rights, organized public demonstrations such as rallies and parades, and coordinated with suffrage associations in other states. Among the people active in the MWSA were physician Martha Ripley, social activist Angelina Grimké, reformer Ednah Dow Littlehale Cheney, and suffragist Susan Walker Fitzgerald.

In 1892, the recent merger of several national suffrage associations and other factors prompted Alice Stone Blackwell and Ellen Battelle Dietrick to write a new constitution for the MWSA that would expand its capacities and funding base (e.g. by making it possible for the MWSA to receive bequests).  The new MWSA was incorporated in December of that year. A decade later, in 1901, it merged with a smaller Massachusetts suffrage organization, the National Suffrage Association of Massachusetts. By 1915, the MWSA had over 58,000 members. Others involved with the organization included Margaret Foley, Sarah E. Wall , and Jennie Maria Arms Sheldon. During her senior year at Radcliffe College, Maud Wood Park was invited to speak at their annual dinner.

Between 1904 and 1915, the MWSA was headquartered at 6 Marlborough Street in Boston's Back Bay, afterwards the headquarters of the Women's Municipal League of Boston and then the home of physician Louis Agassiz Shaw, Jr.

In 1920, after the passage of the 19th Amendment to the Constitution gave women the vote, the MWSA became the Massachusetts League of Women Voters.

Records pertaining to the history of the MWSA are held by Radcliffe College's  Schlesinger Library.

See also
 Boston Equal Suffrage Association for Good Government

References

Further reading
Merk, Lois Bannister. "Massachusetts and the Woman Suffrage Movement". Ph.D. thesis, Schlesinger Library, Radcliffe College, 1961.
Strom, Sharon. "Leadership and Tactics in the American Woman Suffrage Movement: A New Perspective from Massachusetts". Journal of American History 62 (September 1975): 296–315.

Women's suffrage advocacy groups in the United States
Politics of Massachusetts
1870 establishments in Massachusetts
Organizations based in Boston
Organizations disestablished in 1919
Defunct organizations based in Massachusetts
League of Women Voters
Massachusetts suffrage